Gwendolyn M. Miller is the former Chairwoman of the City Council in Tampa, Florida. An educator by training, Miller served four terms on the City Council. She was the first African-American woman elected to the Tampa City Council.

Miller received her bachelor's and master's degrees from Florida A&M University. She was a longtime teacher and human resources specialist in the public schools of Hillsborough County.

She was first elected to the City Council in 1995 as councilwoman for the 5th District, a position she was reelected to in 1999. In 2003 she was elected as an at-large councilwoman. She first became council chairwoman in 2004.

During the March 27, 2007 runoff election, Miller defeated Joe Redner in a heated contest for council chairperson.

Miller is one of three Council Members to vote against the permanent wet-zoning of Cigar City Brewing and extension of operating hours. The company is related to her former council opponent Joe Redner, as it is owned by Redner's son.

She is married to Les Miller, a former State Senator and current Hillsborough County Commissioner.

References

External links
Council Chairwoman Gwen Miller's City of Tampa Official Website

Living people
Politicians from Tampa, Florida
African-American city council members in Florida
African-American women in politics
Educators from Florida
American women educators
Florida A&M University alumni
Florida city council members
Women in Florida politics
Women city councillors in Florida
Year of birth missing (living people)
21st-century African-American people
21st-century African-American women